Calycoseris wrightii, commonly known as white tackstem, is an annual spring wildflower, one of two species in the genus Calycoseris; the other species is C. parryi, the yellow tackstem. They are part of the family Asteraceae.

White tackstem is found in the southwestern United States and northwestern Mexico in California, Nevada, southwestern Utah (Washington County), New Mexico, Arizona, northern Baja California, Sonora, western Texas (El Paso County).United States Department of Agriculture .

It has one easy distinguishing feature: the closed outside of the ray florets contain two linear purple stripes (fine reddish veins abaxially – 2 to 3 cm (1 in)). It is a spring wildflower found in the desert regions and is plentiful after winter rains. It grows up to 4000 ft (1,220 m) elevation.

References

External links
USDA Plants Profile for Calycoseris wrightii (white tackstem)
 Calflora Database: Calycoseris wrightii (White tackstem)
 Jepson Manual eFlora (TJM2) treatment of Calycoseris wrightii

UC Calphotos gallery: Image of closed flower with stripes
Cycloseris wrightii at Lady Bird Johnson Wildflower Center-NPIN: Calycoseris wrightii
 — Close-up of flower-head (High Res photo)

wrightii
Flora of Northwestern Mexico
Flora of the California desert regions
Flora of the Southwestern United States
Flora of the South-Central United States
Flora of the Chihuahuan Desert
Flora of the Sonoran Deserts
Natural history of the Colorado Desert
Natural history of the Mojave Desert
North American desert flora
Plants described in 1853
Taxa named by Asa Gray
Flora without expected TNC conservation status